Irene Loizate Sarrionandia (born 17 May 1995) is a Spanish professional racing cyclist and duathlete, who currently rides for UCI Women's Continental Team .

References

External links

1995 births
Living people
Spanish female cyclists
Place of birth missing (living people)
Duathletes
Cyclists from the Basque Country (autonomous community)
Sportspeople from Biscay
People from Durango, Biscay